Victor Insulators, Inc. based in Victor, New York (founded 1893 by Fred M. Locke) is the oldest insulator company in North America. They originally made glass insulators for electrical lines. They suspended operations during the Great Depression, but resumed operations in 1935 as Victor Insulators. In 1984, the managers purchased the company from Brown Boveri and resumed operating under the name.  They also made diner coffee mugs in the 1940s, 1950s and 1960s. They are still making insulators at the same location to this day.

Coffee Mugs 
During World War II, the Victor Insulator Company responded to a request from the military to develop dining ware that was sturdy, and wouldn't slide easily on tables. The company developed a bowl and a dual-wall coffee mug using the same materials they use to make insulators. They won the government contract, but their coffee mug design quickly caught on in restaurants and diners.

The popular American off-white colored diner-style coffee mug would soon be copied by companies as far away as China. When Victor Insulator Company couldn't compete with the counterfeits on the market, they decided to close their coffee mug manufacturing in the late 1980s.

External links
 Victor Insulators, Inc. official company home page
 Fred M. Locke web page

References

Electronics companies of the United States
Companies based in Ontario County, New York